The Supreme Court of the United States handed down seven per curiam opinions during its 2003 term, which began October 6, 2003 and concluded October 3, 2004.

Because per curiam decisions are issued from the Court as an institution, these opinions all lack the attribution of authorship or joining votes to specific justices. All justices on the Court at the time the decision was handed down are assumed to have participated and concurred unless otherwise noted.

Court membership

Chief Justice: William Rehnquist

Associate Justices: John Paul Stevens, Sandra Day O'Connor, Antonin Scalia, Anthony Kennedy, David Souter, Clarence Thomas, Ruth Bader Ginsburg, Stephen Breyer

Yarborough v. Gentry

Mitchell v. Esparza

Illinois v. Fisher

Muhammad v. Close

Johnson v. California

Middleton v. McNeil

Holland v. Jackson

See also 
 List of United States Supreme Court cases, volume 540
 List of United States Supreme Court cases, volume 541
 List of United States Supreme Court cases, volume 542

References

 

United States Supreme Court per curiam opinions
2003 per curiam